Arpacık can refer to:

 Arpacık, Güroymak
 Arpacık, Ulus
 Arpacık, Yusufeli